La Celette is a commune in the Cher department in the Centre-Val de Loire region of France.

Geography
The A71 autoroute runs through the southwestern part of the territory of the commune.

Population

Sights
 The church of Saints Peter and Paul, rebuilt in the nineteenth century.

See also
Communes of the Cher department

References

Communes of Cher (department)